Callomecyna superba is a species of beetle in the family Cerambycidae. It was described by Tippmann in 1965.

References

Apomecynini
Beetles described in 1965